The National Convention was an alliance of political parties in South West Africa. It was formed in 1971 when the International Court of Justice ruled that South African rule in Namibia was illegal, and it consisted of  various pro-independence groups and parties, including the South West Africa National Union (SWANU), the South West Africa Peoples Organization (SWAPO) and the National Unity Democratic Organisation (NUDO) formed the National Convention as a united front against South African rule. Clemens Kapuuo was its first head.

References

Notes

Literature

1971 establishments in South West Africa
Defunct political parties in Namibia
Political parties established in 1971
Political party alliances in Namibia
Popular fronts